Hilja maitotyttö (English translation The Milkmaid) is a 1953 Finnish drama film directed by T. J. Särkkä, and starred Anneli Sauli, Saulo Haarla and Tauno Palo. A film is based on the 1913 short story "Hilja the Milkmaid" by Johannes Linnankoski. When it premiered in Finland, the film caused a stir and controversy due to its eroticism and the rape scene included in the story; however, the erotic content guaranteed the sale of the film to a dozen other countries.

References

External links 
 

1953 films
1950s Finnish-language films
Films based on short fiction
Films about rape
Obscenity controversies in film
Finnish drama films
1953 drama films
Finnish black-and-white films